Journal of Aggression, Maltreatment & Trauma is a peer-reviewed academic journal that is published ten times per year and covers relevant topic areas and also publishes thematic issues featuring guest editors. It incorporates the Journal of Psychological Trauma, which was published from 2002 until 2008 (known as Journal of Trauma Practice until 2007) and the Journal of Emotional Abuse, which was published from 1997 until 2008. The journal is published by Taylor & Francis and its editor-in-chief is Robert Geffner (Alliant International University).

Abstracting and indexing 
The journal is abstracted and indexed in Published International Literature on Traumatic Stress and PsycINFO.

References

External links 
 

Clinical psychology journals
English-language journals
Publications established in 1997
Taylor & Francis academic journals
Psychotherapy journals